Barry Chedburn (born 24 October 1967) is a South African cricketer. He played in one List A and thirteen first-class matches for Boland from 1991/92 and 1994/95.

See also
 List of Boland representative cricketers

References

External links
 

1967 births
Living people
South African cricketers
Boland cricketers
Cricketers from Cape Town